Aarya is a 2007 Indian Tamil-language romantic comedy film written and directed by Balasekaran and produced by Manoj Kumar and Vijay Anandan. The film stars R. Madhavan and Bhavana, while Prakash Raj and Vadivelu appear in supporting roles. The film's music was composed by Mani Sharma with cinematography by K. V. Guhan and editing by V. Jaisankar. The venture had a theatrical release across Tamil Nadu on 10 August 2007.

Plot
Deepika (Bhavana) is an arrogant, rich girl and the sister of local don Kasi (Prakash Raj). She is a medical college student and dictates terms at the college. In the college, she is feared by students, professors, and even the college dean. Enters Aarya (R. Madhavan), a final-year student who comes to Chennai Medical College from Coimbatore. A soft-spoken Aarya runs into Deepika. They give each other the cold shoulder. In a fit of rage, Deepika kidnaps Aarya's sister, but Aarya faces her challenges daringly. However, she soon falls in love with him, but he is not ready to marry a ruffian's sister. The remaining story tells us how the brother and sister put pressure on Aarya to become a rowdy so his status is equal enough as Kasi's so Aarya can marry Deepika. Meanwhile, "Snake" Babu (Vadivelu) is elected the area councilor and has a few encounters with Aarya and one with Deepika. Finally, Deepika changes her ways, and with her brother's blessings, unites with Aarya.

Cast

 R. Madhavan as Dr. Aarya
 Bhavana as Deepika
 Prakash Raj as Kasi
 Vadivelu as "Snake" Babu
 Devan as HOD
 Kavitha as Aarya's mother
 Tejashree as Dr. Pooja
 Praveen Kumar as Vishwanathan
 Ponnambalam as Meesai Perumal
 Ramji as Thamizharasi
 Thalaivasal Vijay as Collector
 Rajkapoor as Police 
 Crane Manohar as Watchman
 Sudha as Vishwanathan's mother 
 Vengal Rao as Babu's assistant 
 Varshini
 Karnaa Radha
 Alex
 Robert (special appearance in the "Jillendra")
 Simran Khan (special appearance)

Production
R. Madhavan agreed to work on the film during early September 2005 and announced he would feature in a film being made by director Manoj Kumar, after completing work on Thambi (2006). Manoj Kumar assigned Balasekaran to direct the film, a romantic comedy where Madhavan would portray a medical student. Malayalam actress Bhavana was signed on to appear on the film during October 2005, while Prakash Raj was selected to portray her brother, the antagonist of the film. Actress Tejashree was selected ahead of Madhumitha for a role in the film.

The film was shot throughout late 2005 and early 2006, with a simultaneous Telugu version shot featuring Sunil in place of Vadivelu. Fair and Lovely, a brand associated with the film, also held a competition where aspiring actors could audition for a chance to play Madhavan's friend in the film. Praveen from Chennai won the talent hunt and appeared in the film, though he appeared in no further films after he committed suicide in December 2007. However the film ran into production troubles during mid 2006 and was put on hold by the producers. The film later picked up in mid 2007 and was released by the producer, while the Telugu version was shelved.

Soundtrack
Soundtrack was composed by Mani Sharma and the lyrics were written by P. Vijay.
"Aarya" - Karthik, Suchithra
"Ennangira Nee" - Tippu, Anuradha Sriram
"Aruginil" - Karthik, Varthini
"Jillendra" - Ranjith, Rita
"Chile" - Naveen, Saindhavi

Release
The film opened to mixed reviews upon release. Sify.com wrote, "Director Balasekhar has packaged Aarya keeping the ordinary viewer who loves mass movies in mind. Madhavan, Bhavana and Prakash Raj have done their bit to make it work with the viewers and provide a time-pass entertainer". Behindwoods.com gave 1.5/5 saying "It lacks in tight screenplay and coherent narration". Bizhat.com suggested "with more minus points than plus points, Aarya falls under the 'also ran' category", while Thiraipadam.com wrote "the weak screenplay fails to hide the silliness in its basic premise and so the film fails to engage us".

The film was later dubbed and released in Telugu as Arya MBBS and in Hindi as My Dear Big B. In 2015, a film titled a comedy film titled Vellaiya Irukiravan Poi Solla Maatan, taken from a line mouthed in Vadivelu's comedy sequences, was released.

References

External links
 

2007 films
Indian romantic comedy films
2000s Tamil-language films
Films scored by Mani Sharma
2007 romantic comedy films
Films directed by Balasekaran